Mahis (alternatively spelled Mahas) is a town in the Balqa Governorate northwest from the governorate's capital Salt, and  west of Amman. Its population was 17,754 in 2015. Most of the population of Mahis descends from the Abbadi tribe.. Mahis is known for its orchards and its numerous water fountains and springs, notably the Fountain of Mahis.

History
Mahis is believed to emerged during the Roman period, when it bordered Jewish Perea and the territory of Philadelphia - Amman of the Decapolis, and in the Byzantine period between the territory of the dioceses of Gadara and Philadelphia. The name comes from the Arabic word meaning to check out and examine due to its status as a border check point. 

The village was listed in the 1915 Ottoman census for the district of Salt as Mahis and the tribe of Jabara and had a population of 505. 

The Jordanian census of 1961 found 1,154 inhabitants in Mahis.

By the early 1980s, the town became a practical suburb of the capital Amman.

Religious importance
In Mahis there is a shrine of Khidr, a single room surrounded by a small garden with a green flag on top. Near Mahies (2 km West of Mahis) in an area called Wadi Shuaib, is the grave of prophet Shuaib, or Jethro in the biblical tradition.

Economy
Mahis is based on an agrarian economy, including wheat, barley, and tobacco as well as pomegranates, grapes and olives.  The importance of agriculture is decreasing, though figs and olives are still a primary source of income. The area also produces natural goods such as kaolin which is then produced in the neighboring city Fuhais.
The southern part of the Mahis territory called Almeda also attracts tourism due to its forested mountains and location near the Dead Sea/West Bank as well as Amman.  Mahis also focuses on education and is well known for its higher education academic disciplines.

Demographics
In the 2015 Jordanian census Mahis had 3,284 households for a total population of 17,754, of whom 47.6% were females and 52.4% were males. The inhabitants largely descend from the Jabara (Jubarah) section of the Abbad tribal confederation.

Gallery

References

Bibliography

External links
Mahis website
Photos of Mahes at the American Center of Research

Populated places in Balqa Governorate